Sinatra may refer to:

People
Anthony Martin Sinatra (1892–1969), fireman, boxer, and the singer Frank Sinatra's father 
Frank Sinatra (1915–1998), popular and influential American singer, actor, and producer often referred to as "Sinatra"
Nancy Sinatra (born 1940), American singer and actress; the singer Frank Sinatra's daughter
Frank Sinatra Jr. (1944–2016), American singer and conductor; the singer Frank Sinatra's son
Tina Sinatra (born 1948), American film producer and former actress; the singer Frank Sinatra's daughter
Barbara Sinatra (1927-2017), Frank Sinatra's fourth wife
John Sinatra (born 1972), American judge
Ray Sinatra (1904–1980), conductor, second cousin of Frank Sinatra
Stephen Sinatra (born 1946), American physician
Vincenzo Sinatra (1720–1765), 18th-century Sicilian architect from Noto
Sinatraa (born 2000), American esports player

Arts, entertainment, and media

Music
Groups
The Trash Can Sinatras, a Scottish band that began in 1987

Songs
"Sinatra", a song by Helmet from their album Strap It On (1990)
"Frank Sinatra", a song by Cake from their album Fashion Nugget (1996)
"Frank Sinatra" (Miss Kittin & The Hacker song), a 2000 song
"Frankie Sinatra" (2016), a song by the Avalanches
"Sinatra", a song by the Fire Theft from their self-titled album

Television
Sinatra (miniseries) a 1992 television miniseries
Sinatra (TV program), a 1969 television special
Frank Sinatra: A Man and His Music, a 1966 television special

Film
"Sinatra" (1988), a Spanish movie directed by Francesc Betriu, starring Alfredo Landa, based on :
"Sinatra", a 1984 novel by Raúl Nuñez

Other uses
Sinatra (software), a web application framework written in Ruby
Frank Sinatra School of the Arts, a high school in New York City, US
"Sinatra Doctrine", the Soviet government's policy of allowing neighboring nations to determine their own internal affairs
"Sinatra, Sinatra", a poem by Paul Fericano
 Sinatra (wasp), a genus of wasps in the family Figitidae